Jo Bamford (born December 1977) is a British businessman and investor. He is the owner of Wrightbus, a UK-based bus manufacturer, which recently produced the world's first hydrogen powered double-decker bus.

He founded a green hydrogen investment fund in 2021 and subsequently became involved in a number of hydrogen focused businesses. Bamford is also a board member of JCB, which was founded by his grandfather.

Early life & education 
Bamford was born in December 1977 to Anthony Bamford and Carole Bamford. His father spent his career working for the family business JCB, the British manufacturer of construction and farming equipment and founded by his grandfather. His mother is the founder of Daylesford Organic, a farming and lifestyle business.

He was educated at Ampleforth College, following in the footsteps of his father who also attended the boarding school. Bamford worked at his parents' businesses when he was home from Ampleforth. In an interview, Bamford stated he would often be "bolting together engines on the 6am shift for one and birthing lambs on the farm for the other." After Ampleforth College, he attended Edinburgh University, where he graduated with a Master of Arts degree.

Following the death of his grandfather Joseph Bamford in 2001, Jo became a large shareholder in JCB. Despite his father serving as CEO at the time of his graduation from Edinburgh University, he opted for a job in finance in London.

Career

Fund manager 
After graduating from college, Bamford went to work as a fund manager at New Star Asset Management in London. Around 2002, his family invested £4 million into New Star. A fellow employee leaked to the press that Bamford had failed his IMC exam, which is a requirement to work as a fund manager. According to an IMC spokesman, “The exam is a benchmark of basic investment competence. It’s multiple-choice and really isn’t that testing for those who have properly prepared.”

In 2002, Bamford announced that he was moving to Shanghai because he was “sick and tired” of the media attention he received as a billionaire heir. When he left his job at New Star, a colleague sarcastically told the press, “Joe will be sorely missed. Not only was he amusing company he was also superb at playing Solitaire on his computer. He was inspiration at it.”

JCB 
Following his time as a fund manager, Bamford returned to JCB after spending short periods working there as a teenager while he was studying. His first role was as a product specialist for the skid-steer loader at JCB’s North American headquarters in Savannah, Georgia. Beginning in 2004, Bamford was Managing Director of the subsidiary, JCB Utility Products. According to Construction News, Bamford "broadened the appeal of the company’s utility product range to new industry sectors" while in the position. This included the launch of the JCB Workmax. In October 2011, Bamford was given an additional role as managing director of JCB Compact Products. The combined turnover of both businesses at the time was in excess of £150 million.

In 2011, Bamford partly funded the purchase of a 500 acre former BAE Systems-owned Woodford Aerodrome. Many different plans were touted for the site, a large section of the site was earmarked for housing, with developer Redrow plc some of the site. One former aerodrome building was converted to an aviation museum, Avro Heritage Museum. Bamford was promoted in 2014 to Head of Major Contracts at JCB. He remained part of the senior management team at JCB until 2016, a year in which the company celebrated Joseph Bamford's centenary year with a bronze bust at the JCB headquarters.

Hydrogen business 
After working at JCB for over a decade, Bamford moved his focus to green energy. He formed Ryze in 2017, which aimed to create the UK's first network of hydrogen production plants. To advance hydrogen projects, Bamford started HYCAP, a hydrogen investment fund. He raised more than £200m in its first investment round. He is also the owner of Oxford-based Ryse Hydrogen Ltd, which produces hydrogen to fuel up his hydrogen-powered buses. Bamford said that his family provided half of the initial round of investment into HYCAP. The Irish Times has called him a "hydrogen evangelist"; he is an advocate for the adoption of hydrogen energy in transportation.

Since starting Ryse Hydrogen in 2019, Bamford has lobbied the UK government in favour of hydrogen-technology adoption. After “sustained lobbying” from Bamford, the Secretary of State for Transport announced a programme to convert public transportation in towns into all-electric hydrogen buses. According to Passenger Transport, Grant Shapps was “very, very keen that we push hydrogen” after meeting with Bamford about it.

Wrightbus 
In 2019, Bamford purchased the previously financially troubled Northern Irish bus manufacturer Wrightbus, the company that produces London's double-decker red buses. After Bamford bought Wrightbus, the company became the first manufacturer of fuel cell double-decker buses.

In September 2019, Wrightbus was placed into administration, with the loss of 1,200 jobs. In that position, the company faced immediate liquidation unless a buyer could be found.

During negotiations of Bamford’s purchase of Wrightbus, Bamford and Jeff Wright, the owner of Wrightbus, publicly wrangled. At issue were whether the deal would include the business itself, the factories, and land owned by the Wright family. There was much local publicity and a public movement to save the company. In fact, Wrightbus factory workers encouraged the owners to include their land in the agreement as a way to ensure completion of negotiations in order to save their jobs.

During the negotiations, Wright publicly accused Bamford of being “disingenuous.” Wright's public statement:“The failure by Mr. Bamford’s Ryse Hydrogen company to complete the deal to purchase Wrightbus is deeply regrettable, particularly in light of the especially after the exhaustive efforts all of us involved have gone to in providing every possible support. It is disingenuous of Mr. Bamford or his associates to suggest that there were any barriers created by my family through our land holdings. . . . While Although each and every one of the bidders agreed terms, Mr. Bamford also sought to gain unrelated additional farmlands owned by my family.”Wright also spotlighted the role that MP Ian Paisley played in the process, complaining about Paisley’s interference, calling his efforts a “vote campaigning exercise.” He fired a warning shot at Paisley, saying, “Until we establish his motivation and have this position explained he would be well advised to leave the business of deal making to the professionals at Deloittes.”

On 11 October 2019 Bamford publicly announced that the deal was done. In his statement, he praised Paisley “for his hard work and diligence in helping to mediate what has at times been a tricky negotiation.”

On 12 October 2019 Paisley wrote an op-ed in the Belfast Telegraph where he praised Bamford and thanked him for buying Wrightbus.

In early 2021, Wrightbus posted a pre-tax profit of £900k. It had £71.8m in sales for the 15 months to December 2020.

His two companies won a ten-year contract from Transport for London to convert 20 buses to run on hydrogen.

Lobbying, donations and political influence 
In 2019, Paisley asked Secretary of State for Northern Ireland and Conservative MP Julian Richard Smith to use economic assistance to encourage more bus buyers to buy “more British-made buses.” A year later, Smith began to receive payments from Bamford’s hydrogen company Ryse Ltd., which produces hydrogen for use in hydrogen-powered British-made Wrightbus buses, which totaled over £75,000, according to the Register of Members’ Financial Interests. The payments from Bamford’s hydrogen company were documented as being for “work as an external adviser on business development.”

In January 2020, Bamford was quoted as saying that Wrightbus “had been helped by politicians including” Smith and Paisley.

Avro Heritage & US businesses 
In 2012, Bamford took an ex-business partner, Harry Harvey, to court in a dispute about a personal loan when the two purchased property from aerospace company BAE Systems. The two went into business together in 2011. They paired up to purchase the former military airfield 500-acre Woodford BAE Systems property. Harvey and Bamford formed a company together, called Avro Heritage. In 2012, Bamford filed a lawsuit against Harvey and Avro Heritage. The lawsuit was over a dispute about Harvey allegedly misrepresenting parts of the deal to Bamford when Bamford became a personal guarantor to the loan payments. The judge said that he felt both parties had been “driven by tactical maneuvering seeking to impose a cost burden by one upon the other.” The Sunday Times in December 2012 reported that the judge called Bamford’s claim “inappropriate.”

In 2021, Bamford sued an ex-business partner in the U.S. in a dispute over control of a company that the two started together. The business was designed help wealthy, foreign investors get residence in the U.S. in 2017 when Bamford “was strapped for cash following disagreements with his father” in 2017. The case ended with the court denying Bamford’s request to take control of the company. The court also noted that Bamford tried to structure the company to minimize his UK tax bill, saying, “Bamford was interested in holding his interest through an entity rather than personally, which he believed would help minimise his taxes in the United Kingdom.”

The court case, according to The Guardian, provided the public "an extraordinary insight into a world of extreme wealth and privilege within one of Britain’s most prominent industrial families."

Boards of directors 
Bamford has served on the board of directors of dozens of companies. Currently, he is on the board of directors for Bamelectrics Ltd., Nelelectrics Ltd., JCB Consumer Products Ltd., JCB Ltd., and J.C.B. Service.

He also served as a director at the following firms, but resigned: BHoldings Ltd., J.C. Bamford Excavators Ltd., J.C.B. Earthmovers Ltd., J.C.B. Sales Ltd., JCB Cab Systems Ltd., JCB Compact Products Ltd., JCB Heavy Products Ltd., JCB Landpower Ltd., JCB Materials Handling Ltd., JCB Power Systems Ltd., JCB Transmissions, JCB Power Products Ltd., JCB Finance (Leasing) Ltd., JCB Finance Ltd., Landpower Leasing Ltd., Lucas Love Ltd., RAJ Capital Ltd., Panholdco Ltd., and Panholdco 2 Ltd.

Personal life 
Jo Bamford is heir to a multi-billion pound family fortune. His father, Lord Bamford, "is one of the U.K.'s most successful industrialists", chairman of the UK's JCB Company, a manufacturer of excavators, earthmovers and farming equipment, with over 10,000 employees, founded by Joseph Cyril Bamford in 1945.

In 2001, Bamford left a relationship with his then girlfriend Petrina Khashoggi after she posed semi-nude in GQ magazine.

In 2004, Jo Bamford checked into a drug addiction rehabilitation facility to deal with a marijuana problem. In 2021, he admitted to ordering drugs online as well as sending "explicit, inappropriate photographs."

During his trial against a former business partner in Delaware, it was revealed that Bamford is a collector of classic Ferraris and rare pheasants. He also made an attempt in 2013 to buy the Neverland Ranch, the former home of Michael Jackson.

The family is one of the biggest political financial backers behind former UK Prime Minister Boris Johnson.

References 

1977 births
Living people
21st-century British businesspeople
JCB (company)
Wrightbus
Alumni of the University of Edinburgh
British billionaires
Sons of life peers
People educated at Ampleforth College